Glenn Mitchell may refer to:

 Glenn Mitchell (talk radio broadcaster) (1950–2005), American radio personality
 Glenn Mitchell (sports broadcaster), Australian former sports commentator and writer

See also
 Glen Mitchell (disambiguation)